Psilocerea vestitaria is a species of moth of the family Geometridae first described by Charles Swinhoe in 1904. It is found on Madagascar.

Its wingspan is 48.3 mm.

The original description by Swinhoe from 1904 is:

References

Ennominae
Moths described in 1904
Moths of Madagascar
Moths of Africa